Fleury-sur-Orne (literally Fleury on Orne) is a commune in the Calvados department in the Normandy region in northwestern France. It is part of the Communauté urbaine Caen la Mer and of the agglomeration of Caen.

History
Until 1916 Fleury-sur-Orne was known as Allemagne (Calvados) after the Alamanni tribe which once guarded the ford across the Orne. During the First World War this name, meaning in French Germany, became inconvenient and embarrassing for the inhabitants (unlike those of Allemagne-en-Provence in Southern France). The town council therefore decided on 23 August 1916, to change the name and to call it Fleury-sur-Orne in memory of the commune of Fleury-devant-Douaumont, a commune of the Meuse (in 1914: 422 inhabitants, school, church, town hall, 13 tradesmen, 10 landholding farmers), which was destroyed in 1916.

Massacre of the Athis fort
In 1047, Duke William of Normandy (later William the Conqueror), helped by Henry I, king of France, put an end to a revolt of Norman barons at the Battle of Val-ès-Dunes, close to the villages of Chicheboville, Secqueville and Bourguébus. Little is known about this battle, but it seems to have been a purely cavalry contest, with neither infantry nor archers playing a significant role.

After a series of disorderly cavalry skirmishes, the rebellious barons fled. They were slaughtered as they tried to cross the Orne, at the Athis fort close to Fleury-sur-Orne. Carried downstream en masse, the bodies of the massacred knights blocked the mill of Barbillon on the level of current Ile Enchantée.

The victory allowed William to remain Duke of Normandy, thus setting the stage for his later brilliant battles and statecraft.

Population

Personalities
 Nicole Oresme

See also
Communes of the Calvados department

References

External links

Official site
Unofficial site
Tourist information

Communes of Calvados (department)
Calvados communes articles needing translation from French Wikipedia